Palm Spring is a spring in Mesquite Oasis, a desert oasis amidst a mesquite thicket and a few palms, close to Carrizo Creek, within the Anza-Borrego Desert State Park in San Diego County, California.

Palm Spring, first used by the local Native Americans and those traveling to and from the Colorado River, was subsequently used by Spanish and later Mexican traders and American fur trappers and soldiers.  It was a popular camping spot on the Southern Emigrant Trail during the California Gold Rush. It became a water stop for the San Antonio-San Diego Mail Line in 1857 and Palm Spring Station became a relay stage station for the Butterfield Overland Mail from 1858 to 1861. It remained a watering place for later travelers to Arizona and for the stage lines that ran to Yuma, Arizona from 1867 to 1877.

References

Geography of San Diego County, California